The 1990–91 ECHL season was the third season of the ECHL.  In 1990, the league welcomed three new franchises: Cincinnati Cyclones, Louisville Icehawks, and Richmond Renegades.  The Virginia Lancers franchise was renamed the Roanoke Valley Rebels.  The eleven teams played 64 games in the schedule.  The Knoxville Cherokees finished first overall in the regular season.  The Hampton Roads Admirals won their first Riley Cup championship.

League realignment
With the league expanded to eleven teams, the league was realigned to include two separate divisions, East and West.

East Division
Erie Panthers
Hampton Roads Admirals
Johnstown Chiefs
Richmond Renegades
Roanoke Valley Rebels

West Division
Cincinnati Cyclones
Greensboro Monarchs
Knoxville Cherokees
Louisville Icehawks
Nashville Knights
Winston-Salem Thunderbirds

Regular season
Note: GP = Games played, W = Wins, L = Losses, T = Ties, Pts = Points, GF = Goals for, GA = Goals against, Green shade = Clinched playoff spot, Blue shade = Clinched division

Riley Cup playoffs 

E is short for East Division
W is short for West Division

ECHL awards

All-Star Teams

First Team

Second Team

See also
 ECHL
 ECHL All-Star Game
 Kelly Cup
 List of ECHL seasons

ECHL seasons
ECHL season